Lal Bahadur Nagar, commonly known as L. B. Nagar, is a commercial and residential hub in Hyderabad, Telangana, India. It was once a Municipality in Ranga Reddy district.

Demographics 
 India census, L.B. Nagar had a population of 261,987. Males constitute 52% of the population and females 48%. L.B. Nagar has an average literacy rate of 74%, higher than the national average of 79.5%: male literacy is 64%, and female literacy is 52%. In L.B. Nagar, 21% of the population is under 6 years of age.

Politics 

L.B.Nagar is a constituency in the Telangana Legislative Assembly.The leading party is here after 2018 Telangana state legislative assambly elections is TRS Telangana Rastra Samiti Devi Reddy Sudheer Reddy He is the member of lagislative assambly.
Vanasthalipuram, Hayathnagar, Saroornagar part, Dilsukhnagar, kothapet part, and Hasthinapuram are the divisions of this constituency.

Healthcare 
LB Nagar is well surrounded with hospitals like Kamineni Hospital, LB Nagar Hospital etc. and best diagnostic centres like Sprint Diagnostics, LB Nagar Diagnostics etc.

Locations neighbouring LB Nagar like Dilsukhnagar, Hayathnagar, Nagole and Uppal have good hospital and diagnostic centres.
Wards comes under this constituency are
|- LB Nagar

|- Champapet

|- Karmanghat

|- Hayath Nagar

|- Vanasthalipuram

|- Dilsukhnagar

|- Saroornagar part

|- Gaddiannaram part

References 

Neighbourhoods in Hyderabad, India
Cities and towns in Ranga Reddy district
Greater Hyderabad Municipal Corporation